Deslanoside (trade name Cedilanide in Brazil) is a cardiac glycoside, a type of drug that can be used in the treatment of congestive heart failure and cardiac arrhythmia (irregular heartbeat). It is found in the leaves of Digitalis lanata, the Woolly Foxglove.

References 

Cardenolides